Strzelno is a town in Kuyavian-Pomeranian Voivodeship (north-central Poland)/

Strzelno may also refer to:

Strzelno, Lower Silesian Voivodeship (south-west Poland)
Strzelno, Pomeranian Voivodeship (north Poland)